Raw sex may refer to:

a British comedy musical group consisting of Rowland Rivron and Simon Brint, featured regularly on BBC TV's French and Saunders show
bareback sex, sexual activity without the use of condoms